The SS Mohegan was a steamer which sank off the coast of the Lizard Peninsula, Cornwall, on her second voyage. She hit The Manacles on 14 October 1898 with the loss of 106 out of 197 on board.

Design and construction
The ship started life as the Cleopatra, a mixed passenger liner and animal carrier. She was built alongside four others at Earle's Shipbuilding and Engine Company, Hull, for the Wilson & Furness-Leyland Line. She was rated A1 at Lloyd's of London. She was built for 'safety at sea' and was equipped with eight watertight bulkheads, failsafe lighting and pumping systems, eight lifeboats capable of carrying 59 passengers each and three compasses. She could carry 120 first class passengers, with stalls for 700 cattle.

She did not serve with the Wilson & Furness-Leyland Line, but instead was purchased by the Atlantic Transport Line, which was seeking to replace ships that had been requisitioned as troop transports by the United States government for use in the Spanish–American War. The other four ships acquired in this period were the Alexandria, Boadicea, Victoria and Winifreda, at a cost of around £140,000 per ship.

As the Cleopatra

She sailed on her maiden voyage from London to New York on 31 July 1898, arriving on 12 August 1898.  A number of defects were quickly revealed, including the malfunctioning of the water system that fed the boilers, and a number of serious leaks.  The blame was placed on a rushed construction, and the crew struggled to keep the ship operational.  The passengers protested to the company about the poor condition of the ship, but also reported "the splendid conduct of the officers and crew."  The Cleopatra returned to London, limited to half-speed the crossing took 21 days.  Once she had docked an extensive programme of repairs was undertaken, which took 41 days.  She then underwent trials, and was inspected by the Board of Trade.  She was pronounced fit to sail, and was duly renamed Mohegan.

As the Mohegan
Bound for New York, Mohegan sailed from Tilbury Docks at 2:30pm on 13 October 1898, under the command of the 42-year-old Captain Richard Griffith.  She carried 57 passengers, 97 crew, seven cattlemen, and 1,286 tons of spirits, beer, and antimony.  She arrived off Dover at 7:30 that evening, dropping her pilot.  A report on the progress so far from the Assistant Engineer was probably landed at this time.  A few minor leaks and electrical failures were reported but otherwise no major problems had been encountered.

Mohegan then reached her maximum speed as she sailed down the English Channel.  She kept close to the coast as she passed Cornwall, but took the wrong bearing. This was noticed by some of the officers and crew. They had noticed that the Eddystone Lighthouse was too far away and the coast too close. She neared the entrance of Falmouth Harbour and turned towards the entrance of the Helford River and on down The Lizard coast without slowing from 13 knots. This was noticed by the Coverack coastguard, which attempted to signal to her with warning rockets. The Mohegan either was unaware or took no notice, and maintained her course. James Hill, coxswain of the Porthoustock lifeboat, saw the ship, lights ablaze, heading at full speed towards the Manacle Rocks. With a cry of 'She's coming right in!' he called his crew.

Wrecked on the Manacles

The crew were finally alerted now to the danger, whether by the signals from shore or by the 'old Manacle bell' from the buoy, and the engines were stopped at 6:50 PM, but too late.  The Mohegan ran onto The Manacles, embedding the rudder in the rock and tearing the hull open.  The ship first struck Vase Rock and then drifted onto the Maen Varses reef.  Dinner was being served at the time, and many of the passengers were initially unaware of the severity of the accident.  The engine room was almost immediately flooded to a depth of three feet. The steam gauges broke and the crew rushed to the deck. The ship was plunged into darkness soon afterwards.  With the loss of power, the passengers made their way onto the deck, where attempts were made to launch the lifeboats.

Captain Griffith had ordered the fitting of a high second rail inboard of the lifeboats to prevent their being rushed in the event of an emergency, but this now hampered the launching of the boats.  Further problems were encountered when the ship listed to port then heavily to starboard. Only two lifeboats were launched, of which one was virtually swamped and the other capsized. The ship rolled and sank 12 minutes after hitting the rocks, with the loss of 106 lives. Captain Griffith, Assistant Engineer William Kinley and all of the officers went down with the ship. Only her funnel and four masts remained above water. The Porthoustock lifeboat Charlotte was launched in 30 minutes and rescued most of the survivors from the wreck and the water; 44 people were saved.

Aftermath
Most of the recovered bodies of the drowned were buried in a mass grave in St Keverne churchyard, which was given a memorial stained glass window by the Atlantic Transport Line.  Some bodies were sent to London for burial, whilst eight were shipped to New York on the Mohegan'''s sister ship Menominee.  The Scottish poet William McGonagall immortalised the tragedy in his poem The Wreck of the Steamer "Mohegan" Most of the cargo was salvaged, though a diver lost his life in the process.  The wreck gradually disintegrated in the following years. The third officer, 30-year-old William Logan Hindmarsh, is buried in the graveyard in Coverack, with an inscription indicating that the boat company paid for his gravestone and interment.

The wreck of the Mohegan'', and in the next year the stranding of the ocean liner SS Paris on Lowland point, led to the introduction of the Coverack lifeboat.  The remains of the wreck are popular with divers, and artefacts such as crockery and brass portholes are occasionally recovered. A magnificent staircase salvaged from the wreck stands in Coverack youth hostel, at Parc Behan, School Hill, Coverack.

The ship's bell resides at the Bell Inn in Thetford, Norfolk.

Controversy
The sinking was the greatest disaster in the history of the Atlantic Transport Line to date, and occurred in mysterious circumstances, as the ship had steered some distance off course.  The Board of Trade enquiry recorded

"that a wrong course – W. by N. – was steered after passing the Eddystone, at 4.17 pm." 

The loss of all of the officers in the wreck meant that no explanation could be found for the course, and it was ascribed to human error.

References

External links
Report on the career and sinking
The wreck of the Mohegan
A diver's report on the Mohegan
New York Times report of the sinking

1898 ships
Ships built on the Humber
Steamships of the United Kingdom
Merchant ships of the United States
Maritime incidents in 1898
Shipwrecks in the English Channel
Cornish shipwrecks
History of Cornwall
Wreck diving sites in the United Kingdom